The Zambezian and mopane woodlands is a tropical and subtropical grasslands, savannas, and shrublands ecoregion of southeastern Africa.

The ecoregion is characterized by the mopane tree (Colophospermum mopane), and extends across portions of Botswana, Malawi, Mozambique, Namibia, South Africa, Eswatini, Zambia, and Zimbabwe, including the lower basins of the Zambezi and Limpopo rivers.

The more humid Southern Zanzibar-Inhambane coastal forest mosaic and Maputaland coastal forest mosaic ecoregions lie between the Zambezian and mopane woodlands and the Indian Ocean. The Zambezian and mopane woodlands lie generally at a lower elevation, and has lower rainfall, than the neighboring miombo woodlands ecoregions, which occupy the plateaus and escarpments above the river lowlands. It is bounded to the southwest by the Drakensberg Range and Southern African Bushveld and Drakensberg montane grassland, woodland, and forest ecoregions. To the west, it transitions to the drier Zambezian Baikiaea woodlands and Kalahari Acacia-Baikiaea woodlands on the Kalahari sands of the Southern African Plateau.

Protected areas
Protected areas in the ecoregion include:
 Liwonde National Park, Malawi
 Banhine National Park, Mozambique
 Chipinge Safari Area, Zimbabwe
 Gonarezhou National Park, Zimbabwe
 Gorongosa National Park, Mozambique
 Kruger National Park, South Africa
 Limpopo National Park, Mozambique
 Lower Zambezi National Park, Zambia
 Mana Pools National Park, Zimbabwe
 Matusadona National Park, Zimbabwe
 Save Valley Conservancy, Zimbabwe
 Zinave National Park, Mozambique

See also

References
 Burgess, Neil, Jennifer D’Amico Hales, Emma Underwood (2004). Terrestrial Ecoregions of Africa and Madagascar: A Conservation Assessment. Island Press, Washington DC.

External links
 Zambezian and Mopane woodlands (Encyclopedia of Earth)

 
Afrotropical ecoregions
Ecoregions of Botswana
Ecoregions of Malawi
Ecoregions of Mozambique
Ecoregions of Namibia
Ecoregions of South Africa
Ecoregions of Eswatini
Ecoregions of Zambia
Ecoregions of Zimbabwe
Tropical and subtropical grasslands, savannas, and shrublands
Zambezian region